Troiţa may refer to:

 Troiţa, a village in Vozneseni Commune, Leova district, Moldova
 Troiţa, a village in Găleşti Commune, Mureș County, Romania

See also 
 Troiţcoe, a commune in Cimişlia district, Moldova